Adrienne at Large was a Canadian half-hour public affairs television show. The show was broadcast on CBC Television at 10 p.m. on Thursdays from September 26, 1974, until January 2, 1975. Adrienne Clarkson and Glenn Sarty hosted the show.

External links
 Queen's University Directory of CBC Television Series (Adrienne at Large archived listing link via archive.org)

1974 Canadian television series debuts
1975 Canadian television series endings
CBC Television original programming
1970s Canadian documentary television series